Henry Riley or Henry Reilly may refer to:

Henry Riley (scientist) (1797–1848), British surgeon and naturalist, co-discovered the Thecodontosaurus
Henry Thomas Riley (1816–1878), English translator, lexicographer, and antiquary
Henry Chauncey Riley (1835–1904), missionary bishop
Henry Reilly, Northern Irish politician
Henry J. Reilly (1881–1963), American soldier and journalist

See also
Harry Riley (disambiguation)